Kevin Rankin may refer to:

 Kevin Rankin (basketball) (born 1971), retired American/Turkish basketball player
 Kevin Rankin (actor) (born 1976), American actor
 Kevin Rankin, drummer with A Flock of Seagulls